Reference Re Ng Extradition was a 1991 case in which the Supreme Court of Canada held that it was permissible to extradite Charles Ng, a fugitive, to the United States, where he was wanted on charges of several murders and might face the death penalty. The issue came before the court in the form of a reference from the federal government, which asked the court for an advisory opinion as to whether the extradition of a fugitive threatened with execution would violate the Canadian Charter of Rights and Freedoms.

Along with the Kindler case, the ruling in Re Ng Extradition was essentially overturned in 2001 with United States v. Burns.  In Burns, the Supreme Court found extraditing people to countries in which they might face the death penalty breached fundamental justice under the Charter. 

In 1998, Ng was convicted by a jury in California of eleven counts of murder and sentenced to death. , official California Department of Corrections and Rehabilitation records show Ng still waits on death row, where no executions have taken place since 2006.

Background 
Charles Chi-Tat Ng was wanted by the State of California on multiple counts of murder, kidnapping, and burglary, for which he potentially faced the death penalty. After his accomplice Leonard Lake confessed to their crimes—and committed suicide—Ng fled to Canada. 

On July 6, 1985, in Calgary, Alberta, he was caught shoplifting. While resisting arrest, he shot a security guard in the hand. The United States petitioned the government to have Ng extradited. Ng submitted a habeas corpus request, which was denied, followed by an application to the Alberta Court of Appeal and the Supreme Court of Canada, all of which were denied.

In response to requests to gain an assurance from the United States government not to seek the death penalty, the Minister of Justice submitted the following questions to the Supreme Court:

Ruling 
The Court answered both questions in the negative. There were two majority opinions in the case, written by Gérard La Forest and Beverley McLachlin, with Claire L'Heureux-Dubé and Charles Gonthier concurring with both. Both majority opinions referred to Kindler v. Canada (1991), where the Court considered the same question and found that there was no Charter violation.

Antonio Lamer, John Sopinka, and Peter Cory dissented on both questions. Cory concluded that without any assurance from the United States against imposing the death sentence, there would be a clear violation of s.12 of the Charter, which could not be saved under s.1. Sopinka's opinion referred to s.7 of the Charter but reached the same conclusion as Cory.

See also
 List of Supreme Court of Canada cases

References

External links
 

Canadian immigration and refugee case law
Canadian Charter of Rights and Freedoms case law
Supreme Court of Canada cases
Capital punishment in the United States
Death penalty case law
1991 in Canadian case law
1991 in international relations
Capital punishment in Canada
Canadian extradition case law
Canada–United States relations
Supreme Court of Canada reference question cases